Randidangazhi is a Malayalam novel written by Thakazhi Sivasankara Pillai in 1948. The novel tells the story of the cruelty meted out by feudal landlords to impoverished farm labourers. In 1958, a film adaptation with the same name was released.

The novel was translated into Hindi by Bharati Vidyarthi as Do Ser Dhan (Sahitya Akademi, 1957). The novel was translated into Gujarati by Kamal Jasapara as Be Sher Dangar (Sahitya Akademi, 1978).

Notes

External links
 

1948 novels
Malayalam novels
Novels set in Kerala
Novels by Thakazhi Sivasankara Pillai
Indian novels adapted into films
1948 Indian novels